Ralph Rimmer is a rugby league administrator who was the Chief Executive Officer of the Rugby Football League from 2018 to 2022. He was appointed the full-time chief executive after a period of being the interim CEO. He held the post of Chief Operating Officer for the RFL before being appointed CEO. He was appointed to the role of COO in 2010.

Administration

Sheffield-Huddersfield
Rimmers first sports administrative role was in 1997 when he was appointed chief executive of Sheffield Eagles during the early days of the Super League. He enjoyed success with the club winning the Challenge Cup Final in 1998, however as financial pressures developed he then became one of the key players in the 1999 merger with Huddersfield Giants. After the merge Rimmer subsequently became chief executive of the new club and held that position until 2004, when he was succeeded by the incumbent, Richard Thewlis.

During this time until 2002 Rimmer took the part time position of managing the Ireland rugby league team as they appeared at the 2000 World Cup.

Stadium management and Huddersfield Town
After leaving the Giants in 2004 Timmer was appointed Managing Director of the Kirklees Stadium whilst also a member of the Board of Huddersfield Town AFC. Rimmer spent six years as Managing Director of the stadium until he took up a post at the Rugby Football League.

Rugby Football League
Rimmer was appointed Chief Operations Officer of the RFL in 2010 and was promoted to Chief Executive Officer in 2018 following the departure of his predecessor Nigel Wood. Rimmer announced he would leave the RFL at the end of 2022.

Controversy

Academy debacle
In May 2021 under Rimmers leadership of the RFL, the governing body stripped four Super League clubs, Catsleford, Hull KR, Leigh and Salford as well as Championship club Bradford of elite academy status. The announcement was met with outrage and Rimmer was forced to reverse the decision after an interview with Sky Sports and backlash from the rest of the sport.

Racism allegations
'In September 2022 at the RFL annual awards night at Headingley, Rimmer was discussing Fiji's World Cup preparations ahead of a warm up game with England during a speech and said: “Fiji have already arrived. We don’t think anybody has been arrested yet, do we? No, we’re all right, so we are going pretty well then.”

The comments were met with immediate backlash and calls for him to quit his post as RFL CEO early (as he was standing down at the end of the year). Rimmer apologised unreservedly and an investigation is underway.

References

Rugby league administrators
Living people
1965 births